The 1908 Washington gubernatorial election was held on November 3, 1908. Republican nominee Samuel G. Cosgrove defeated Democratic nominee John Pattison with 62.56% of the vote.

Primary elections
Primary elections were held on September 8, 1908.

Democratic primary

Candidates 
John Pattison, Mayor of Colfax
A.J. Splawn
William Blackman
Jimmie Durkin
Patrick S. Byrne

Results

Republican primary

Candidates
Samuel G. Cosgrove, attorney
Albert E. Mead, incumbent Governor
Henry McBride, former Governor
John D. Atkinson
William M. Ridpath
Robert B. Brown
Oscar H. Neil
J.W. Robinson

Results

General election

Candidates
Major party candidates
Samuel G. Cosgrove, Republican 
John Pattison, Democratic

Other candidates
George Boomer, Socialist
Arthur S. Caton, Prohibition

Results

References

1908
Washington
Gubernatorial